Theobroma speciosum is an arboriform species of flowering plant in the mallow family native to northern South America. It is the 35th most abundant species of tree in the Amazon rainforest.

Name

Specific epithet 
The specific epithet 'speciosum' is used to indicate that a plant is aesthetically pleasing; it is a neuter form of 'speciosus', which is Latin for 'beautiful'.

Common names 
Theobroma speciosum has a number of common names:

 In Bolivia it is called chocolatillo
 In Brazil it is called cacauí or cacau de macaco
 In Peru it is called cacaoy, cacaoíllo, cacau-rana, cacao biaro, cupuyh or cacao sacha

Description 
The trunk is straight, with plagiotropic (horizontally growing) side branches. The canopy is small. Its leaves are simple, and have a coriaceous (leather-like) surface with trichomes (hairs). Leaf arrangement is distichous (leaves alternate between one side of the stem and the other). Flowers are red, and grow on the trunk in dense clusters.

Distribution 
Theobroma speciosum is native to:

 Bolivia
 Brazil, where it has been recorded as present in the following states:
 Acre
 Amapá
 Amazonas
 Maranhão
 Mato Grosso
 Pará
 Rondônia
 Peru
 Venezuela

Ecology 
The fruit of T. speciosum is a food source for primates and rodents. Its flowers are pollinated by flying insects.

Uses

Food 
The flesh of the fruit of is eaten by the Ka'apor and Tacana peoples. The seeds are used to make chocolate, and could also be used to make cocoa butter substitutes.

The flowers are edible, and contain high concentrations of antioxidants.

Hygiene 
The fruit capsules can be used to make soap and deodorant.

Genetic resource 
As a crop wild relative, T. speciosum could be used as a source of genetic variability for T. cacao, which is widely cultivated for its cocoa beans.

Ornamental 
T. speciosum is occasionally grown in gardens as an ornamental plant.

Diseases 
Colletotrichum luxificum, a species of pathogenic fungus, can cause witch's broom disease in Theobroma speciosum.

Notes

References 

speciosum
Trees of the Amazon
Edible plants